Dr. Michelle Lee (born 13 July 1982) is an American plastic surgeon and television personality.  She is the founder of PERK plastic surgery and the creator of a luxury medical-grade skincare line PERKPotions. She is known for her appearance as a plastic surgeon on the E! Entertainment's reality series Dr. 90210.

Early life and education
Lee was born in Shanghai on July 31, 1982, and grew up there. When she was nine years old, her family moved to San Diego, and she completed her high school education at Torrey Pines High School. She subsequently went on to the University of California, Los Angeles, to study classical piano and English literature. Lee traveled to Germany, Portugal, and Russia to perform as a classical pianist for the United States in a piano performance series. She's also been a soloist with a number of symphonies. Lee also enrolled at the University of Pennsylvania in 2005, where she received a Merit Scholarship to study medicine. Lee completed her plastic surgery residency and aesthetic surgery fellowship at Case Western Reserve University and Harvard University, respectively.

Career
Lee started her career in 2009, when she became a plastic surgery resident working at Case Western Reserve University. After six years of her residency, Lee completed the Peter Jay Sharp Aesthetic and Reconstructive Breast Surgery Fellowship at Harvard Medical School, Beth Israel Deaconess Medical Center.

In 2016, Lee joined the DuPage Medical Group, where she worked for over two years as a plastic surgeon. Lee has also done extensive research and written numerous publications about optimizing outcomes in rhinoplasty, facial rejuvenation as well as migraine surgery.

She then started PERK Plastic Surgery, a medical aesthetics practice based in Beverly Hills in 2019. She starred in a plastic surgery-themed show,  Dr. 90210, a sitcom about Beverly Hills' best female plastic surgeons who succeed in a male-dominated field. Lee performed a rhinoplasty on supermodel Arisce Wanzer.  She also performed a live liquid rhinoplasty on the E! Daily Pop TV show.

Personal life
Lee married Bjorn Lobo in Palos Verdes, who is a neurosurgeon after they met in residency. She is fluent in English and Chinese.

References

1982 births
Living people
American plastic surgeons
American women television personalities